Witch Doctor may refer to:
 Witch doctor, a type of practitioner of traditional healing arts

Music
Witchdoctor (rapper), musician and member of Atlanta's Dungeon Family
"Witch Doctor" (song), a 1958 song by Ross Bagdasarian a.k.a. David Seville
The Witch Doctor (album), a 1961 album by Art Blakey and the Jazz Messengers
Witch Doctor (album), a 1985 live album by Chet Baker
Witch Doctor, a 1979 album by Instant Funk
"Witch Doktor", a 1994 song by Armand van Helden

Other uses
Witch Doctor (comics), a horror/medical drama comic
Witch Doctor (film), a 2016 Chinese-Thai film
Witch doctor, a character class in Diablo 3
Witch Doctor, a villain in the Hero Factory series
Witch Doctor, a combat robot competing in Battlebots

See also
Dr. Bombay (character), a character from Bewitched
"I'm Your Witchdoctor", a song by John Mayall
The Witch Doctor Will See You Now, a television documentary series presented by Piers Gibbon